Rouben Zachary Mamoulian (October 8, 1897 – December 4, 1987) was an American film and theatre director.

Early life
Mamoulian was born in Tiflis, Russian Empire, to a family of Armenian descent. His mother, Virginia (née Kalantarian), was a director of the Armenian theatre, and his father, Zachary Mamoulian, was a bank president. Mamoulian moved to England and started directing plays in London in 1922. He was brought to the United States the next year by Vladimir Rosing to teach at the Eastman School of Music and was involved in directing opera and theatre.

In 1925, Mamoulian was head of the School of Drama, where Martha Graham was working at the time. Among other performances, together they produced a short, two-color film titled The Flute of Krishna, featuring Eastman students. Mamoulian left Eastman shortly after, and Graham chose to leave also, even though she was asked to stay. In 1930, Mamoulian became a naturalized citizen of the United States. Child star Jackie Cooper stated in his autobiography that Rouben Mamoulian was his uncle, and this fact helped establish Cooper's early movie career.

Stage career
Mamoulian began his Broadway director career with a production of DuBose Heyward's Porgy, which opened on October 10, 1927. He directed Wings Over Europe from late 1928 to 1929. He directed the revival of Porgy in 1929 along with George Gershwin's operatic treatment Porgy and Bess, which opened on October 10, 1935. Mamoulian was also the first to stage such notable Broadway works as Oklahoma! (1943), Carousel (1945), and Lost in the Stars (1949).

Film career
He directed his first feature film in 1929, Applause, which was one of the early sound films. It was a landmark film owing to Mamoulian's innovative use of camera movement and sound, and these qualities were carried to his other films released in the 1930s. Dr. Jekyll and Mr. Hyde (1931) is regularly considered the best version of Robert Louis Stevenson's tale; Queen Christina (1933) was the last film Greta Garbo made with John Gilbert; both benefit from being made before the "Hays Code" came into full force. The musical film Love Me Tonight was released in 1932.

He directed the first three-strip Technicolor film Becky Sharp (1935), based on Thackeray's Vanity Fair, as well as the 1937 musical High, Wide, and Handsome. His next two films earned him wide admiration, The Mark of Zorro (1940) and Blood and Sand (1941), both remakes of silent films. Blood and Sand, about bullfighting, was filmed in Technicolor, and used color schemes based on the work of Spanish artists such as Diego Velázquez and El Greco. His foray into screwball comedy in 1942 was a success with Rings on Her Fingers starring Henry Fonda and Gene Tierney.

Mamoulian's last completed musical film was Metro-Goldwyn-Mayer's 1957 film version of the Cole Porter musical Silk Stockings. This was one of Porter's less successful stage musicals and was based on the 1939 Ninotchka. The film Silk Stockings starred Fred Astaire and Cyd Charisse, with Janis Paige and Peter Lorre in supporting roles.

Mamoulian's film directing career came to an end when he was fired from two consecutive films: Porgy and Bess (1959) and Cleopatra (1963). He previously had been fired as director of Laura (1944). After directing the highly successful original stage productions of Oklahoma! and Carousel, he worked on only a few other theatrical productions, such as St. Louis Woman, which introduced Pearl Bailey to Broadway audiences.

He personally was recruited by Directors Guild of America (DGA) co-founder King Vidor in 1936 to help unionize fellow movie directors. Mamoulian's lifelong allegiance to the DGA, and more so his general unwillingness to compromise, contributed to his being targeted in the Hollywood blacklisting of the 1950s.

He died on December 4, 1987 at the Motion Picture & Television Country House and Hospital of natural causes at the age of 90 in Woodland Hills, California.

The critical appraisal Rouben Mamoulian by Tom Milne was published as Cinema One Series, no. 13 by Thames & Hudson, 1969.

The biography Mamoulian: Life on Stage and Screen by David Luhrssen was published in 2013 (University of Kentucky Press).

Style
In the interview compilation book Directing the Film (Acrobat Books), Mamoulian declared a strong preference for a stylized look to his scenes, stating that he was more interested in creating a poetic look to his films than in showing ordinary realism. Parts of Becky Sharp, and almost the whole of Blood and Sand, with their heightened and artificial use of Technicolor, demonstrate Mamoulian's aesthetics. He also wrote a book titled Applause.

Legacy
Mamoulian is considered one of the greatest filmmakers of his generation, whose films were seminal in their genres. 

On February 9, 1960, Mamoulian received a star on the Hollywood Walk of Fame.

It has been established in DC Comics that his film The Mark of Zorro is the film that Bruce Wayne and his family saw in the theater before his parents were murdered. Mamoulian’s film The Mark of Zorro is one of the biggest inspirations of the character Batman. The biggest similarities include the cowl, the dark personality, and mystery of his identity. In Batman: The Animated Series, the character Gray Ghost was inspired by Mamoulian’s version of Zorro. 

The Sydney Film Festival has an award named after him: the Rouben Mamoulian Award for the Best Director of an Australian Short Film.

Awards and honors
On February 8, 1960, for his contribution to the motion picture industry, he received a star on the Hollywood Walk of Fame at 1709 Vine Street.

He was inducted into the American Theatre Hall of Fame in 1981.

In 1982 Mamoulian received a Lifetime Achievement Award from the Directors Guild of America.

In 2019, Mamoulian’s film Becky Sharp was selected by the Library of Congress for preservation in the National Film Registry for being "culturally, historically, or aesthetically significant".

Filmography

Other work

Studies and biographies
 Rouben Mamoulian, Tom Milne, Cinema One Series no. 13, Thames & Hudson 1969

See also

References

External links

 
 
 
 Theater Programs, Playbills and Miscellany from the Rouben Mamoulian Collection at the Library of Congress
 Obituary – "Rouben Mamoulian, Broadway Director, Is Dead" by Peter B. Flint in The New York Times on December 6, 1987.

American theatre directors
American film directors
American people of Armenian descent
Donaldson Award winners
Eastman School of Music faculty
Soviet emigrants to the United States
Film people from Tbilisi
Georgian people of Armenian descent
1897 births
1987 deaths
Burials at Forest Lawn Memorial Park (Glendale)